The Department of the Registrar Western Australian Industrial Relations Commission is a department of the Government of Western Australia.

The department is responsible for providing the Western Australian Industrial Relations Commission and the Industrial Magistrates Court of Western Australia with the infrastructure as well as the human, administrative and financial resources to perform their roles.

The origins of the department date back to 1900, when the Industrial Conciliation and Arbitration Act 1900 established the Registrar of Friendly Societies as part of the Crown Law Department, with Edgar Theodore Owen appointed as the first registrar. It remained under the Crown Law Department until 1964, when it was moved to the Department of Labour and Industry before becoming its own department as the Department of the Registrar in 1989. In 1995, it moved to its current location at St Georges Terrace in Perth.

Registrars
The department and its predecessors were headed by a registrar:

References

External links
 Government of Western Australia website
 Department of the Registrar Western Australian Industrial Relations Commission

Registrar
1989 establishments in Australia
Government agencies established in 1989
Industrial relations